Gathiruini is a settlement in Kenya's Central Province. It is a small town along kwamaiko nyanduma road.

References 

Populated places in Central Province (Kenya)